George Wright was an Anglican priest in Ireland in the 17th century.

Wright was ordained in 1621; and was Archdeacon of Dromore from 1629 until the Irish Rebellion of 1641.

Notes

Archdeacons of Dromore
Alumni of Trinity College Dublin
17th-century Irish Anglican priests